Deme N'Diaye (born 6 February 1985) is a Senegalese former professional footballer who played as a striker. He previously played for Portuguese club Estrela Amadora, and French clubs Arles-Avignon, RC Lens, and Arras FA.

Career
N'Diaye began his career with Dakar-based team AS Douanes and signed in January 2006 for C.F. Estrela da Amadora.

N'Diaye signed for AC Arles-Avignon from Estrela Amadora on 17 July 2009.

In December 2019, having been without a club after leaving National 2 side Arras FA, he dropped out of professional football to join a local team.

References

External links
 
 

Living people
1985 births
Senegalese footballers
Footballers from Dakar
Association football forwards
Senegal international footballers
C.F. Estrela da Amadora players
AS Douanes (Senegal) players
AC Arlésien players
RC Lens players
Primeira Liga players
Ligue 1 players
Ligue 2 players
Championnat National 2 players
2012 Africa Cup of Nations players
Senegalese expatriate footballers
Senegalese expatriate sportspeople in Portugal
Expatriate footballers in Portugal
Senegalese expatriate sportspeople in France
Expatriate footballers in France